A signature is a hand-written, possibly stylized, version of someone's name, which may be used to confirm the person's identity. The writer of a signature is a signatory or signer.

Signature or signatory may also refer to:

Businesses and organizations
 Signature (charity), trading name of UK-based Council for the Advancement of Communication for Deaf People (CACDP)
 Signature (whisky), a brand of Indian whisky
 Signature, a brand of the clothing company Levi Strauss & Co.
 Signature Books, a publisher of Mormon works
 Signature Digital Menus, a company specializing in the provision of digital menu boards
 Signature Flight Support, a British fixed-base operator
 Signatures Restaurant, a restaurant formerly owned by Washington lobbyist Jack Abramoff
 Signature School, a charter school in Evansville, Indiana spanning grades 9–12
 Signature Team, a French motor racing team
 Signature Theatres, a movie theatre chain in California, Hawaii, and Montana operated by Regal Entertainment Group
 Signatory Vintage Scotch Whisky Company, a Scottish company that owns the Edradour distillery

Computing 
 Signature block, text automatically appended at the bottom of an e-mail message, Usenet article, or forum post
 Type signature, which defines the inputs and outputs for a function or method
 Electronic signature, or e-signature, refers to data in electronic form, which is logically associated with other data in electronic form and which is used by the signatory to sign.

Cryptography 
 Blind signature, digital signature in which the content of a message is disguised
 Digital signature (or public-key digital signature), a method for authenticating information
 Digital Signature Algorithm, a United States Federal Government standard
 Electronic signature, a signature imputed to a text via one or more of several electronic means, or cryptographic means to add non-repudiation and message integrity features to a document
 ElGamal signature scheme, based on the difficulty of computing discrete logarithms
 Key signature (cryptography), the result of applying a hash function on a key
 XML Signature, a W3C recommendation that defines an XML syntax

Mathematics 
 Signature (logic), description of a set of function and relation symbols in mathematical logic
 Signature (permutation), a measure for the number of pairs a permutation maps out of order
 Signature of a real quadratic form
 Metric signature of the metric tensor on a pseudo-Riemannian manifold
 Signature (topology) of a 4k-dimensional compact oriented manifold
 Signature of a knot, in knot theory
 Prime signature, the multiset of exponents in the prime factorisation of a number

Music 
 Key signature, a series of sharp or flat symbols placed on the staff, designating notes that are to be played one semitone higher or lower
 Signature (Moya Brennan album), a 2006 album by Irish musician Moya Brennan
Signature (Joe album)
 Signature (Patrice Rushen album)
 Signature Records, a mid-20th century United States-based record label
 Signature song, the one song that a popular and well-established artist is identified with
 Time signature, a notational device used to specify how many beats are in each bar and which note value constitutes one beat

Science 
 Acoustic signature, a combination of acoustic emissions
 Doctrine of signatures, the notion that the appearance of plants is a function of their celestial influences
 Isotopic signature, a characteristic set of ratios of stable or unstable isotopes
 Metric signature, in physics, refers to the form of a metric tensor: the sign of the diagonal components constitutes its "signature"
 Signature change, in relativity
 Radar cross-section
 Spectral signature, the specific combination of reflected and absorbed electromagnetic (EM) radiation at varying wavelengths which can uniquely identify an object

Other uses 
 Seal (East Asia), with sometimes a short inscription
 Signature (dance group) (born 1979), British Bhangra act in the 2008 series of the television show Britain's Got Talent
 Signature Bridge, over the Yamuna river, Delhi, India
 Signature crime, a crime which exhibits characteristics unique to an offender's psychology
 In bookbinding, an alternative word for section (bookbinding)
 Signature mark, a mark at the bottom of a gathering to assist the bookbinder in collation
 Signature Place, a residential skyscraper located in St. Petersburg, Florida
 Signature (typography journal), a 20th-century journal published in Britain

See also
Cignature, a South Korean girl group